Stenobaris is a genus of flower weevils in the beetle family Curculionidae. There is one described species in Stenobaris, S. avicenniae.

References

Further reading

 
 
 

Baridinae
Articles created by Qbugbot